KEBT (96.9 FM "La Caliente 96.9") is a radio station licensed to Lost Hills, California, United States. The station is owned by American General Media of California.  The station airs a Spanish music format.  Its studios are located at the Easton Business Complex in southwest Bakersfield, and its transmitter is located west of McKittrick, California.

History

The station was assigned the KEBT call letters by the Federal Communications Commission on May 22, 2006. On May 30, 2006, KEBT began its broadcast in Bakersfield with a Rhythmic/Old School format.  The station was known as 96.9 The Beat.

On September 27, 2007, the station changed programming formats and is now a Regional Mexican station known as La Caliente 96.9.

Programming
Programming on this station includes El Piolin on mornings, Eriko al Mediodia and El Show Del Cascabel on afternoons.

References

External links

EBT
EBT
Radio stations established in 1996